{{Infobox pageant titleholder|nocat_wdimage=y
| name                = Margie Moran
| photo               =
| birth_name          = Maria Margarita Roxas Moran
| title               = Binibining Pilipinas Universe 1973Miss Universe 1973| competitions        = Binibining Pilipinas 1973(Winner – Binibining Pilipinas Universe 1973)Miss Universe 1973(Winner)(Miss Photogenic)
| height              = 
| eye_color           = Brown
| hair_color          = Dark Brown
}}Maria Margarita Roxas Moran-Floirendo (born 15 September  1953), professionally known as Margie Moran', is a Filipino beauty queen, actress and peace advocate who was the president of Ballet Philippines and is the chairperson of the Cultural Center of the Philippines. She is best known for winning the second Miss Universe crown for the Philippines as Miss Universe 1973.

Early life and education
Moran was born on 15 September 1953 in Manila, Philippines, to lawyer Francis Gonzalez Morán and Rosario McIlvain Roxas.

Her father Francis Morán was the son of Chief Justice Manuel Morán and Nieves Gonzalez de Morán, a granddaughter of Don Francisco Gonzalez y Reinado, owner of the legendary 39,000-hectare Hacienda Esperanza'' that included the municipalities of Santa Maria, Santo Tomas, Rosales and San Quintin, extending through the rest of Pangasinan and the provinces of Tarlac and Nueva Ecija.

Her mother Rosario "Charo" Roxas is one of three children born to Manuel Roxas, fifth president of the Philippines, and Juanita Muriedas McIlvain. Her siblings are Consuelo Roxas-Javellana and Manuel "Manny" Roxas, Jr.

She graduated high school from St. Theresa's College and attended college at Maryknoll College (now Miriam College). Prior to joining the Miss Universe pageant, she modeled part-time for the fashion designer, Auggie Cordero.

Moran holds a degree in business administration from Boston University, and a masters in development management from SOAS University of London.

Pageantry

She won the right to represent the country in the Miss Universe pageant in Athens, Greece after winning the Binibining Pilipinas competition in 1973. 
Moran said that she entered the contest because of the incessant urgings of friends and family. The 19-year-old, 5 ft 6 in beauty ultimately won the Miss Universe 1973 title and also garnered the Miss Photogenic award. She is one of the only four Miss Universe winners to also win Miss Photogenic, the others being Margareta Arvidsson, Janelle Commissiong, and Denise Quiñones.

Life after Miss Universe

Two years after her reign, she married and managed to finish her Business Administration degree at Maryknoll College and Boston University and took her master's degree at the federal University of London, awarded through the School of Oriental and African Studies. She headed several private companies like a resort called "Pearl Farm" in Samal Island, Davao del Norte from 1989 to 1994, hosted "Margie on Mindanao" on TV and produced a multi-awarded movie, Bagong Buwan. Moran is also notable for her social and civic works especially for promoting peace and livelihood as part of the Mindanao Commission on Women Organization and recently as an ambassador-trustee of Habitat for Humanity Philippines.

Her passion and experience as a dancer at the age of 18, prompt her to promote arts and culture with Southern Philippines Foundation for the Arts, Culture and Ecology. She ran the over-all operations of Ballet Philippines as its president from 2009 to 2018. In January 2018, Moran was appointed by President Rodrigo Duterte as member of the Board of Trustees of the Cultural Center of the Philippines. She was elected as the cultural agency's chairperson in April 2018.
 
Moran was 21 years old when she married congressman Antonio R. Floirendo, Jr. of Davao del Norte but after 30 years of marriage, they are now living separate lives. They have two daughters, Monica Danielle and Gabrielle Antoinette.

Filmography

Film

Television

See also 

 Gloria Diaz
 Pia Wurtzbach
 Catriona Gray
 Binibining Pilipinas
 Philippines at Major Beauty Pageants

References

External links

   

1953 births
Alumni of SOAS University of London
Binibining Pilipinas winners
Living people
Miriam College alumni
Miss Universe 1973 contestants
Miss Universe winners
People from Manila
Roxas family
Visayan people
Duterte administration personnel
Heads of government agencies of the Philippines